Arctic Circle is a Finnish-German crime drama television series that premiered on Finnish streaming service Elisa Viihde at Christmas 2018 and later on Yle. The series stars Iina Kuustonen, Maximilian Brückner, Pihla Viitala, Clemens Schick and Susanna Haavisto.

Arctic Circle is the first co-production between Finland's Yellow Film & TV and Germany's Bavaria Film, picked up for world distribution by Paris-based Lagardère Studios. The series was created by Yellow Film & TV CEO Olli Haikka and Head of Drama Petja Peltomaa with Joona Tena who shares the writing credit with Iceland's experienced Jón Atli Jónasson. Arctic Circle is directed by Finnish-born, Germany-based Hannu Salonen.

Plot
Set in an icy Finnish Lapland, Finnish police officer Nina Kautsalo (Iina Kuustonen) finds a nearly dead prostitute in a cabin in the wilderness. The case takes a surprising turn when a deadly virus is found in the prostitute's body. Nina and German virologist Thomas Lorenz (Maximilian Brückner) start investigating the case.

Cast and characters

 Iina Kuustonen as Nina Kautsalo
 Maximilian Brückner as Thomas Lorenz 
 Pihla Viitala as Marita Kautsalo 
 Jari Virman as Raunola 
 Clemens Schick as Marcus Eiben 
 Joi Johansson as Jens Mathiesen 
 Susanna Haavisto as Elina Kautsalo 
 Venla Ronkainen as Venla Kautsalo 
 Inka Kallén as Sari Nikander 
 Janne Kataja as Niilo Aikio 
 Kari Ketonen as Jaakko Stenius 
 Mikko Leppilampi as Esko Kangasniemi 
 Taneli Mäkelä as Reino Ylikorpi 
 Maria Ylipää as Gunilla Lorenz 
 Kari Hietalahti as Hamari 
 Kristo Salminen as Reidar Hamari 
 Alina Tomnikov as Lana

Episodes

Season 1 (2018-19)

Season 2 (2021-22)

Production
In November 2017, it was announced that the main cast would consist of Iina Kuustonen, Maximilian Brückner, Clemens Schick and Pihla Viitala. It was also announced that filming of season one would begin in Finland later that month, on the 27th of November 2017. Filming of season 2 took place in Finnish Lapland during the autumn of 2020 and later winter/early spring of 2021.

Release
The series aired on ZDF in Germany in 2020. In North America the rights to the series were acquired by Topic. As part of its ongoing distribution deal Lagardère Studios Distribution also sold the rights to Polar+ (France), RTS (Switzerland), BeTV (Belgium), Videotron (Canada), NPO (The Netherlands), IVI (Russia), Canal Plus (Poland), RTP (Portugal), Cosmopolitan TV (Spain), Elisa (China) and FTV Outre-mer 1e (France overseas).

See also
 Bordertown
 Deadwind

References

External links
 
 About Arctic Circle on fanpage gesucht wird: Maximilian Brückner

Finnish drama television series
German drama television series
German crime television series
Laestadianism in popular culture
2018 German television series debuts
2010s Finnish television series
2010s German police procedural television series
2020s German police procedural television series
Finnish police procedural television series